Oleg Șișchin (born 7 January 1975) is a Moldovan professional football coach and a former player. He is an assistant coach with FC Milsami.

Career
Șișchin made 38 appearances for the Moldova national football team.

Șișchin made three appearances in the UEFA Champions League 2008-09 while playing for Inter Baku.

He was one of the 11 Moldovan football players challenged and beaten by Tony Hawks and features in his book Playing the Moldovans at Tennis.

International goals
Scores and results list Moldova's goal tally first.

References

External links
 
 

Moldovan footballers
Moldova international footballers
Moldovan expatriate footballers
Expatriate footballers in Azerbaijan
Moldovan expatriate sportspeople in Azerbaijan
Expatriate footballers in Russia
Moldovan expatriate sportspeople in Russia
FC Spumante Cricova players
FC Tiraspol players
PFC CSKA Moscow players
Russian Premier League players
FC Saturn Ramenskoye players
FC Tom Tomsk players
FC Khimki players
Shamakhi FK players
Footballers from Chișinău
1975 births
Living people
FC Kristall Smolensk players
Association football midfielders
FC Avangard Kursk players
FC Dynamo Saint Petersburg players